Ode to Joy is an album by Canadian indie rock band The Deadly Snakes, released in 2003 on In the Red Records.

Track listing

Personnel
 Matt "Dog" Carlson - trumpet, harmonica, bass, guitar, vocals
 André Ethier - vocals, guitar
 Max "Age of Danger" McCabe-Lokos - piano, organ, vocals, percussion
 Greg Cartwright - vocals, guitar
 Andrew Gunn - drums
 Jeremy Madsen - saxophone
 Yuri Didrichsons - bass, guitar
 David Cheppa - mastering
 Peter Hudson - engineer, slide guitar

References

2003 albums
The Deadly Snakes albums
In the Red Records albums